Piet Retief Commando was a light infantry regiment of the South African Army. It formed part of the South African Army Infantry Formation as well as the South African Territorial Reserve.

History

Origin
This Commando has its origins prior to the Anglo Boer War protecting the community of Piet Retief from incursions from Swaziland.

Operations

With the Zuid Afrikaanse Republiek
Defence of the ZAR border February 1900: The task of defending the eastern line became the responsibility of General Lucas Meyer, with the Vryheid, Utrecht, Swaziland, Piet Retief, Johannesburg, Krugersdorp and Middelburg commandos under his command.

With the Union Defence Force

With the SADF
During this era the unit was mainly used for area force protection, search and cordones as well  asstock theft control assistance to  the local police.

The unit resorted under the command of Group 12.

With the SANDF

Disbandment
This unit, along with all other Commando units was disbanded after a decision by South African President Thabo Mbeki to disband all Commando Units. The Commando system was phased out between 2003 and 2008 "because of the role it played in the apartheid era", according to the Minister of Safety and Security Charles Nqakula.

Unit Insignia

Leadership

See also 

 South African Commando System

References

Infantry regiments of South Africa
South African Commando Units